Each winner of the 1960 Governor General's Awards for Literary Merit was selected by a panel of judges administered by the Canada Council for the Arts.

English Language
Fiction: Brian Moore, The Luck of Ginger Coffey

Poetry or Drama: Margaret Avison, Winter Sun

Non-Fiction: Frank H. Underhill, In Search of Canadian Liberalism

French Language
Poetry or Drama: Anne Hébert, Poèmes

Non-Fiction: Paul Toupin, Souvenirs pour demain

Governor General's Awards
Governor General's Awards
Governor General's Awards